I Am Invincible (foaled 21 September 2004) is a stakes winning Australian bred thoroughbred racehorse that is most notable for his success as a stallion, having sired more than 60 individual stakes winners.

Background

I Am Invincible was purchased at the 2006 Inglis NSW Classic Twilight Session by his original trainer Toby Edmonds for owners Ray & Brett Gall for the amount of A$62,500.

Racing career

I Am Invincible won his debut race by five lengths on the 21 February 2007 at Warwick Farm.  
The performance convinced trainer Toby Edmonds to set the horse towards the Golden Slipper.  He next lined up in the Kindergarten Stakes.  Drawn near the outside in a field of 14, the horse again showed brilliant speed to cross and sit in second place before finishing a game third to the eventual Golden Slipper winner Forensics.

Injured at his next start when down the track in the Todman Stakes, the horse was forced off the scene for a prolonged period. 
He recaptured his best form as a four year-old for Victorian trainer Peter Morgan with brilliant wins in the D.C. McKay Stakes at Morphettville and the Sir John Monash Stakes at Caulfield.

In 2009 he ran a memorable second to Takeover Target in The Goodwood.  Jockey Darren Gauci took him to the lead and kicked clear rounding the turn, however he was overtaken late to be beaten a length.

Stud career

I Am Invincible was retired from racing to stand at Yarraman Park Stud in Scone, New South Wales.  His initial service fee was $11,000.  This increased to $247,500 in 2019, making him the most expensive stallion in Australia.   He has recently serviced two of Australia's greatest horses, Winx and Black Caviar.

Notable Progeny

I Am Invincible has currently sired 14 individual Group 1 winners:

c = colt, f = filly, g = gelding

Pedigree

References 

Australian racehorses
Racehorses bred in Australia
Racehorses trained in Australia
2004 racehorse births
Thoroughbred family 1-n